Aphelia septentrionalis is a species of moth of the family Tortricidae. It is found in North America, where it has been recorded from Alaska.

References

Moths described in 1959
Aphelia (moth)
Moths of North America